Black Nore Lighthouse (also known as Blacknore Point Lighthouse) at Portishead, Somerset, England, was built in 1894.
It is a Grade II listed building.

Description
The metal white-painted lighthouse was built by Trinity House to guide shipping in the Severn Estuary as it made its way in and out of Bristol Harbour. Before the light was decommissioned the lens array (a rotating fourth-order 250 mm biform optic) flashed twice every ten seconds.

History
The light was first lit on 19 April 1894. Up until World War II the lighthouse was lit by gas, supplied from the gas main and stored in adjacent tanks. The rotating optic was installed in 1908 when the light characteristic was changed to group flashing (twice every ten seconds). Its drive mechanism was wound daily by the Ashford Family, on whose land it was built, until 1941 when the light was converted to automatic electric operation. In 2000 the winding and drive mechanisms were replaced by electric motors.

Decommissioning and preservation
After it was judged to be no longer needed for navigational purposes, the light was decommissioned on 27 September 2010. Set to be demolished, the structure was instead sold to a trust for preservation at a cost of £1 in October 2011. The official handover took place the following January, and later that year the lenses (which had been removed along with other equipment as part of the decommissioning) were returned to the lantern on a ten-year loan from Trinity House.

See also 

 List of lighthouses in England

References

External links 

 Black Nore Lighthouse Trust
 

Lighthouses completed in 1894
Lighthouses in Somerset
Grade II listed buildings in North Somerset
Portishead, Somerset
Grade II listed lighthouses